Jacob W. Prout (1804–1849) was a Liberian politician and physician. He served as the secretary of the 1847 constitutional convention.

Biography
Prout was born free in 1804 in Baltimore, Maryland. He immigrated to the Commonwealth of Liberia in 1826. In the colonial Liberian government, Prout had been employed as a register of wills. In 1832, Prout returned to Baltimore with favorable accounts of Liberia. On his return on 9 December 1832, 146 Black Marylanders emigrated to Liberia, in part due to his accounts. During the travel, the first officer David C. Landis accused Prout of a number of improprieties. Landis's charges included ignoring the medical needs of passengers, as well as a sexual indecency. Prout served as a physician for the American Colonization Society until 1840, when Governor Thomas Buchanan abolished Prout's post to cut the colony's costs.

On 5 July 1847, the delegates to Liberia's constitutional convention first convened and elected officers. Prout was elected as secretary of the convention. Most of the papers relating to the convention have been lost, though a surviving account of the convention from Dr. James W. Lugenbeel, the American Colonization Society's white resident physician, criticized Prout's secretarial abilities, though it is unclear if Lugenbeel's negative portrayal of Prout's abilities are accurate. The convention produced the Liberian Declaration of Independence, as well as the republic's first constitution.

Prout's son, William A. Prout, served as governor the Republic of Maryland.

In 1847, Prout was elected as a member to the Senate of Liberia. In 1849, Prout died by drowning in Monrovia.

References

Date of birth missing
Date of death missing
1804 births
1849 deaths
Americo-Liberian people
American emigrants to Liberia
Physicians from Baltimore
Politicians from Baltimore
Secretaries
Members of the Senate of Liberia
Deaths by drowning
19th-century Liberian politicians
19th-century Liberian physicians